In New Zealand, the Recording Industry Association of New Zealand (RIANZ) compiles the top forty singles chart each week. Sales of songs determined 75% of the sorting information, and radio airplay figures were responsible for 25%. From 18 April 2004 to 29 May 2007 the sales/radio airplay split was 50:50. Downloads of songs were included from 29 May 2007. The reporting period is from Monday to Sunday, with the week's chart published the next Monday. Before 18 April 2004, the chart week was from Sunday to Saturday, with the chart published on Sunday. Afterwards, the chart week was from Monday to Sunday, with the charts published on Monday. This meant there was a one-day charting period for 18 April 2004, with the next chart published on 19 April 2004. As a result, Usher spent three weeks and one day at number one with "Yeah!" instead of four complete weeks.

A total of 170 singles topped the chart in the 2000s, including 23 by New Zealand artists. Twenty artists had three or more number-one singles; the most successful was Akon, whose seven number-ones totalled twenty-three weeks on top of the chart. Chris Brown, Eminem, and the Black Eyed Peas each had five of their singles go to number one.

Scribe's double A-side "Stand Up"/"Not Many" spent the longest at number one, with twelve weeks. This is the most weeks at number one ever by a New Zealander, and the second most for any song, after Boney M.'s "Rivers of Babylon" had fourteen weeks in the top spot in 1978. "Axel F", by Crazy Frog, and "Brother", by Smashproof and Gin Wigmore each had eleven weeks at the top spot. "Brother" broke the record for the longest consecutive number-one reign by a New Zealand artist, previously set by "Sailing Away" by All of Us in 1986.

On 29 May 2006, "Crazy" by Gnarls Barkley replaced "Hips Don't Lie" by Shakira and Wyclef Jean at the top of the chart, and became the 500th number-one single in the RIANZ New Zealand Singles Chart's history.

The source for this decade is the Recorded Music NZ chart, the chart history of which can be found on the Recorded Music NZ website or Charts.nz.

 – Number-one single of the year
 – Song of New Zealand origin
 – Number-one single of the year, of New Zealand origin

 ← 1990s
 2000
 2001
 2002
 2003
 2004
 2005
 2006
 2007
 2008
 2009
 2010s →

2000

2001

2002

2003

2004

2005

2006

2007

2008

2009

Artists with the most number-one songs

These totals includes singles when the artist is "featured"; that is, not the main artist

Excluded statistics
This excludes band members' individual number-ones. "Beep", by will.i.am, and Fergie's "London Bridge" and "Big Girls Don't Cry" also reached number one.
This excludes "Independent Women Part I", by Beyoncé's former band, Destiny's Child.

Most weeks at number-one

See also
New Zealand Top 50 Singles of 2000
New Zealand Top 50 Singles of 2001
New Zealand Top 50 Singles of 2002
New Zealand Top 50 Singles of 2003
New Zealand Top 50 Singles of 2004
New Zealand Top 50 Singles of 2005
New Zealand Top 50 Singles of 2006
New Zealand Top 50 Singles of 2007
New Zealand Top 50 Singles of 2008
New Zealand Top 50 Singles of 2009
Music of New Zealand
List of UK Singles Chart number ones of the 2000s
List of Billboard number-one singles

Notes

References

Bibliography

Singles
2000s
New Zealand